The 60th Infantry Division "Sabratha" was an infantry division of the Royal Italian Army during World War II. The Sabratha was raised in May 1937, in Gharyan in Italian Libya and named after the nearby ancient Roman city of Sabratha. The division's regimental depots were in mainland Italy in Campania and shared with the 25th Infantry Division "Bologna", with both divisions recruiting their troops from and training them there. The division was destroyed on 25 July 1942 during the First Battle of El Alamein in Egypt and its remnants used to fill up the depleted ranks of the 102nd Motorized Division "Trento". The Sabratha was classified as an auto-transportable division, meaning it had some motorized transport, but not enough to move the entire division at once.

History 
The division's lineage begins with the Brigade "Verona" established on 2 June 1883 with the 85th and 86th infantry regiments. The brigade fought on the Italian front in World War I and together with its regiments was disbanded on 25 December 1917 after having been destroyed in the Battle of Caporetto.

The brigade and its two regiments were raised again on 1 June 1918 in Albania and fought on the Macedonian front. On 18 November 1926 the brigade command and the 86th Infantry Regiment were disbanded, while the 85th Infantry Regiment "Verona" was transferred to the XXVIII Infantry Brigade. On 9 May 1937 the 60th Infantry Division "Sabratha" was activated in Gharyan in Libya and in September of the same year the 85th Infantry Regiment "Verona" left the 28th Infantry Division "Vespri" in Sicily and was transferred to Libya to join the Sabratha. The same year the 86th Infantry Regiment "Verona" and the 42nd Artillery Regiment were reactivated in Italy and then transferred to Libya to join the Sabratha.

The division's major units were:

 60th Infantry Division "Sabratha", in Gharyan
 85th Infantry Regiment "Verona", in Yafran
 86th Infantry Regiment "Verona", in Zawiya
 42nd Artillery Regiment, in Gharyan

In 1939 the division's three regiments were renamed "Sabratha".

World War II 
During the Italian invasion of France from 10-25 June 1940 the Sabratha was deployed along the French Tunisian-Libyan border. After the signing of the Franco-Italian Armistice signed on 24 June 1940 the Sabratha returned to its base in Gharyan south of Tripoli.

When the British Western Desert Force started to crush the Italian 10th Army during Operation Compass in late 1940 the Sabratha deployed to defensive positions south of Derna. In late January 1941 the division fought a series of delaying battles against superior British forces, which were advancing through the Derna-Al Qubbah region. On 30 January 1940, as the danger of encirclement became apparent, the Sabratha division retreated through Sulunţah, Marj and Benghazi, and arrived in Qaminis on 5 February 1941. The already heavily degraded division was almost completely destroyed during the Battle of Beda Fomm on 6-7 February 1941. Afterwards the remnants of the Sabratha retreated on the Ajdabiya-Sirte route, and were then assigned for coastal defense in the Al Khums region in Western Libya. In May 1941 the replenished division was ordered to defensive positions inland, to cover the Gharyan-Nalut front, with most units covering the approach to Gharyan south of Tripli. By September 1941 the reformed Sabratha returned to the front in the east near Tobruk.

After the return to the front the Sabratha met with mixed fortune during continuing Western Desert campaign. Initially, the Sabratha was covering the Sallum area in Egypt, but soon the British Operation Crusader began to overrun the Axis' positions and the division was forced into another arduous retreat through Minqār ‘Ayn al Ghazālah, Derna, Al Qubbah and Mechili. On 23 December 1941 the division made a stand on the coastal road at Brega blocking further Allied advances.

On 23 January 1942 the Sabratha started to advance again, partially enveloping Ajdabiya from the north-east. In May 1942 during the Battle of Gazala the Sabratha played an important role in the capture of 6,000 prisoners at Gazala after the 101st Motorized Division "Trieste" and 15th Panzer Division had defeated the British 2nd and 4th Armoured Brigades. By 20 June 1942 the division was located east of Acroma. After the Fall of Tobruk on 21 June 1942, the Sabratha accelerated its movement, passing in quick succession through Bardia, Sollum and Sidi Barrani, reaching the vicinity of El Alamein on 1 July 1942.

Before the positions to the West of El Alamein were adequately fortified, the Australian 26th Brigade attacked. On 10 July 1942 the Sabratha was routed under a heavy artillery barrage, with over 1,500 Italians made prisoner. The Italians reacted vigorously and a battalion of the 102nd Motorized Division "Trento" was ordered to retake the position. While the Italian counterattack failed to achieve its objective, it bought time to allow the Italian XXI Army Corps to rush in a battalion of the 101st Motorized Division "Trieste", the III Tank Squadrons Group of the "Regiment "Lancieri di Novara" and Major Gabriele Verri's XI Tank Battalion to stabilize the sector and stop the Australian advance. In the meantime the Sabratha had recovered from the initial blow and Colonel Angelozzi's I Battalion/ 85th Infantry Regiment "Sabratha" launched a counterattack against Tell-el-Eisa on 14 July supported by Italian tanks. The attack succeeded to pierce the enemy line on the Tell-el-Eisa Ridge. Under fierce pressure the Australian troops were forced to withdraw from their forward positions, but their main defenses remained largely intact. On 25 July 1942 the survivors of Sabratha were incorporated into the 61st Infantry Regiment "Sicilia" of the Trento division and the Sabratha was officially declared dissolved on 13 August 1942.

Organization 

  60th Infantry Division "Sabratha", in Gharyan
 85th Infantry Regiment "Sabratha", in Yafran
 Command Company
 3x Fusilier battalions
 Support Weapons Company (65/17 infantry support guns)
 Mortar Company (81mm Mod. 35 mortars)
 86th Infantry Regiment "Sabratha", in Zawiya
 Command Company
 3x Fusilier battalions
 Support Weapons Company (65/17 infantry support guns)
 Mortar Company (81mm Mod. 35 mortars)
 42nd Artillery Regiment "Sabratha", in Gharyan
 Command Unit
 I Group (100/17 howitzers)
 II Group (75/27 field guns)
 III Group (75/27 field guns)
 2x Anti-aircraft batteries (20/65 Mod. 35 anti-aircraft guns)
 Ammunition and Supply Unit
 LX Tank Battalion "L" (L3/35 tankettes)
 LX Machine Gun Battalion
 LX Mixed Engineer Battalion
 60th Telegraph and Radio Operators Company
 1x Engineer Company
 1x Searchlight Section
 LX Replacements Battalion
 60th Anti-tank Company (47/32 anti-tank guns)
 11th Medical Section
 2x Field hospitals
 1x Surgical unit
 20th Supply Section
 105th Transport Section
 1x Bakers section
 105th Carabinieri Section
 260th Field Post Office

After the division had been almost completely destroyed during the Battle of Beda Fomm it was rebuild with the following changes:
 both infantry regiments fielded now two instead of three fusilier battalions
 the destroyed 42nd Artillery Regiment was replaced by the Artillery Grouping "Sabratha" with the CCLXXXII and CCLXXXIV groups, which were both equipped with 75/27 field guns
 the 60th Bersaglieri Motorcyclists Company was added to the division
 the 403rd and 406th anti-aircraft batteries replaced the division's two lost batteries

Attached to the division in 1942:
 Battalion Group "Giovani Fascisti" (until March 1942)
 Command Company
 2x Volunteer battalions
 Anti-tank Company (47/32 anti-tank guns)
 Mortar Company (81mm Mod. 35 mortars)
 Navy Battalion "San Marco" (Royal Italian Navy)
 XXXIII Sapper Battalion

Additional forces joined the division temporarily:
 XVIII Anti-aircraft Artillery Group (8.8 cm Flak 37)
 XLII Anti-aircraft Artillery Group (7.5 cm kanon 37)

Commanding officers 
The division's commanding officers were:

 Generale di Divisione Giuseppe Tellera (9 May 1937 - 31 August 1938)
 Generale di Divisione Guido Della Bona (1 September 1938 - 2 May 1941)
 Colonel Riccardo De Cosa (acting, 3-25 May 1941)
 Generale di Divisione Mario Soldarelli (26 May 1941 - 13 August 1942)

Notes

References 

 

Infantry divisions of Italy in World War II
Military units and formations established in 1937
Military units and formations disestablished in 1942